Karpuk is a surname, which could refer to:
 Ilya Karpuk (born in 1997), Russian football player
 Mykola Karpuk (born in 1982), Ukrainian bodybuilder and personal trainer
 Pete Karpuk (c. 1927 – 1985), Canadian football player.